Priscilla Ruddle (born 12 July 1976) is a former Australian female volleyball player. She was part of the Australia women's national volleyball team.

She competed with the national team at the 2000 Summer Olympics in Sydney, Australia, finishing 9th. She participated in the 2002 FIVB Volleyball Women's World Championship.

See also
 Australia at the 2000 Summer Olympics

References

External links
 

1976 births
Living people
Australian women's volleyball players
People from Melbourne
Volleyball players at the 2000 Summer Olympics
Olympic volleyball players of Australia